Jenny Nyström (born 2 February 1994) is a Finnish badminton player, specializing in doubles play. She started playing badminton at 6 years old, then in 2009, she joined the national team.

In 2013, she won the Estonian International and Irish International tournaments in mixed doubles event with her partner Anton Kaisti. In 2015, she became the runner-up of Hellas International in women's doubles event with Mathilda Lindholm. In 2016, she won Hellas Open in the women's doubles and runner-up in the mixed doubles.

Achievements

BWF International Challenge/Series (7 titles, 5 runners-up) 
Women's doubles

Mixed doubles

  BWF International Challenge tournament
  BWF International Series tournament
  BWF Future Series tournament

References

External links 

 

1994 births
Living people
Sportspeople from Helsinki
Finnish female badminton players
Badminton players at the 2015 European Games
European Games competitors for Finland